Liponematidae is a family of sea anemones.

References

 
Actinioidea
Cnidarian families